Enova SF is a Norwegian government enterprise responsible for promotion of environmentally friendly production and consumption of energy. Its stated purpose is to explore new sources of clean energy, reduce overall energy consumption, and to provide educational materials to the public promoting energy-efficient practices. Established in 2001, it is financed through government funding in addition to a tariff of 1 øre per kWh of electricity to consumers. The company is owned by the Norwegian Ministry of Petroleum and Energy and based in Trondheim.

References

External links
Official website

Government-owned companies of Norway
Companies based in Trondheim
Companies established in 2001
Ministry of Petroleum and Energy